Mustilia is a genus of moths of the Endromidae family. The genus was previously placed in the subfamily Prismostictinae of the Bombycidae family.

Selected species
Subgenus Mustilia
Mustilia attacina Zolotuhin, 2007
Mustilia castanea Moore, 1879
Mustilia falcipennis Walker 1865
Mustilia lieftincki Roepke, 1948
Mustilia lobata Zolotuhin, 2007
Mustilia orthocosta Yang, 1995
Mustilia pai Zolotuhin, 2007
Mustilia sabriformis Zolotuhin, 2007
Mustilia sphingiformis Moore, 1879
Mustilia sphingiformis gerontica West, 1932
Subgenus Smerkata Zolotuhin, 2007
Mustilia brechlini Zolotuhin, 2007
Mustilia craptalis Zolotuhin, 2007
Mustilia fusca Kishida, 1993
Mustilia phaeopera Hampson, 1910
Mustilia soosi Zolotuhin, 2007
Mustilia tzarica Zolotuhin, 2007
Mustilia ulliae Zolotuhin, 2007
Mustilia zolotuhini Saldaitis & Ivinskis, 2015
Subgenus unknown
Mustilia columbaris Butler, 1886
Mustilia glabrata Yang, 1995
Mustilia semiravida Yang, 1995
Mustilia terminata Yang, 1995

References

External links
Three New Species of Mustilia from Guangxi (Lepidoptera: Bombycidae)

 
Endromidae